Mahanaga was an early monarch of Sri Lanka of the Kingdom of Ruhuna in the southern region of the island. He is the founder of the Ruhuna. The Kingdom of Ruhuna was in some periods a client state loyal to the King of Anuradhapura and in some periods a country independent of it.

Background 
The king Mutasiva had nine sons, including Devanampiya Tissa, Uttiya, Mahasiva, Mahanaga and Asela. After the death of Mutasiva, the eldest son Devanampiya Tissa became the king. According to the customs of Anuradhapura kings, Uttiya, Mahasiva and Mahanaga should have come to the throne next. Devanampiya Tissa's son's turn was next. Devanampiya Tissa's consort Ramadatta didn't like that. She planned to bring her son to the throne sooner, by murdering Mahanaga.

One day when Mahanaga was working with his men in a field, the queen sent them a basket of poisoned mangoes. Unfortunately Devanampiya Tissa's son ate the fruit and died. Prince Mahanaga thought, it's not good to be in the city, and left Anuradhapura with his family and men and migrated to Ruhuna.

See also
 List of monarchs of Sri Lanka
 List of Ruhuna monarchs

External links 
Kings & Rulers of Sri Lanka
Codrington's Short History of Ceylon

Anuradhapura period
Prince of Ruhuna